Anton Tsvetanov (born 1880, date of death unknown) was a Bulgarian long-distance runner. He competed in the men's 10,000 metres at the 1924 Summer Olympics.

References

External links
 

1880 births
Year of death missing
Athletes (track and field) at the 1924 Summer Olympics
Bulgarian male long-distance runners
Olympic athletes of Bulgaria
Place of birth missing